Below is a list of newspapers published in Namibia, along with their status of public or private and their primary language of publication.

Daily newspapers

Weekly, bi-weekly, or monthly newspapers

National
Insight Namibia, private, English
Namibia Economist, private, English, since 2016 only online
Omutumwa, private, Oshiwambo
Oshili24, private, English
The Villager, private, English, since 2018 only online
Windhoek Observer, private, English

Regional
Buchter News, Lüderitz, private, English
The Caprivi Vision, Zambezi Region, private, English/siLozi
Namib Times, Erongo Region, private, English/Afrikaans

Historic newspapers
Namibia Today, private, mouthpiece of the SWAPO party, English.  dormant.

See also
 Mass media in Namibia

References

Larsen, Martin Buch (2007): Media Ownership and Legislation in the Republic of Namibia: 1990 – 2007
Rothe, Andreas (2010): Media System and News Selection in Namibia

Namibia
Newspapers, List of